Geraeus picumnus is a species of flower weevil in the family of beetles known as Curculionidae.

References

Further reading

External links

 

Baridinae
Beetles described in 1908